Savannah Marie DeMelo (born March 26, 1998) is an American professional soccer midfielder who plays for Racing Louisville FC in the National Women's Soccer League. She was the fourth pick in the 2022 NWSL Draft.

College career 
DeMelo played five years at the University of Southern California, making 75 appearances and tallying 17 goals and 28 assists for the Trojans. A regular starter over her college career, DeMelo was a three-time All-Pac-12 selection, including All-Freshman team honors in 2017. As a sophomore in 2018, DeMelo scored nine goals and assisted 10 others en route to United Soccer Coaches All-American honors. DeMelo missed her junior season because of a torn Achilles' tendon, but she successfully returned to action as a senior, starting all 14 games. USC reached the NCAA Tournament in each of the five years DeMelo played for the Trojans.

Professional career 
Racing Louisville selected DeMelo with the fourth pick in the 2022 NWSL Draft, two spots after the club selected fellow midfielder Jaelin Howell. DeMelo made her professional debut on March 25, playing 11 minutes off the bench against the Houston Dash in Racing's second game of the 2022 NWSL Challenge Cup. She started for the first time on April 2 in a 3–0 win against the Kansas City Current. DeMelo started every Racing match in the 2022 NWSL season, scoring four goals and assisting two while leading the league in scoring chances created and fouls won. DeMelo's first professional goal, a game-winning direct free kick against San Diego Wave FC on May 18, 2022, was featured on ESPN's SportsCenter Top 10.

International career 
DeMelo delayed her start at USC to play for the United States in the 2016 U-20 Women's World Cup. She also played in the 2018 U-20 Women's World Cup, scoring four goals, and helped the U.S. win the 2015 CONCACAF Women's U-20 Championship in Honduras.

In September and October 2022, DeMelo received her first call-ups to the U.S. Women's National Team but did not feature.

Honors

Racing Louisville FC 

 NWSL Best XI of the Month: May 2022
 NWSL Rookie of the Month: July 2022

References 

1998 births
Living people
American women's soccer players
United States women's under-20 international soccer players
National Women's Soccer League players
Racing Louisville FC draft picks
Racing Louisville FC players
USC Trojans women's soccer players
Women's association football midfielders